Charles Bressler (April 1, 1926 – November 28, 1996) was an American tenor.

He was born in Kingston, Pennsylvania, and studied at the Juilliard School with Lucia Dunham. He became a founding member of the New York Pro Musica, with which he toured from 1953 to 1963. He taught at the Manhattan School of Music. In 1956 he appeared in "The Lark", starring Julie Harris, at the Longacre Theatre in New York City.

He is noted for his performances of early music. He also made a number of important recordings with Maurice Abravanel and the Utah Symphony, notably the Vanguard recording of the Berlioz Requiem.  In addition, he appeared on the Los Angeles Philharmonic recording of Respighi's Lauda per la Natività del Signore along with Marilyn Horne, Marie Gibson, and the Roger Wagner Chorale, conducted by Alfred Wallenstein. He died in New York City, aged 70.

References

External links
 http://www.bach-cantatas.com/Bio/Bressler-Charles.htm

20th-century American male opera singers
American operatic tenors
Manhattan School of Music faculty
1926 births
1996 deaths